Schaaf may refer to:

People (as surname)
Alan Schaaf, American businessman
Bree Schaaf (born 1980), American skeleton racer
David D. Schaaf (born 1939), American politician and businessman
Ernie Schaaf, American boxer
Harry Schaaf, American athlete
Jim Schaaf, American foofball executive
Joe Schaaf, American basketball player
Johannes Schaaf, German film director, opera director, and actor
Libby Schaaf (born 1965), American politician
Robert Schaaf, American physician
Thomas Schaaf, German professional football player